XHTG-FM/XETG-AM is a radio station on 90.3 FM and 990 AM in Tuxtla Gutiérrez, Chiapas. The station is owned by Radio Núcleo and is known as La TG, La Grande.

History

XETG-AM 990 received its concession on March 6, 1973. It was owned by Amin Simán Habib, founder of Radio Núcleo, and broadcast with 10,000 watts. The station later increased its daytime power to 20 kW.

In 2010, XETG was authorized to move to FM. It remains on AM under a continuity obligation for 37,458 otherwise unserved listeners who do not receive XHTG-FM or another authorized station.

References

Radio stations in Chiapas
Radio stations established in 1973
Radio stations in Mexico with continuity obligations